Amir Weiner (born 17 September 1961) is an American historian and associate professor of Soviet history at Stanford University. His interests include mass violence, population politics, totalitarianism, and World War II. Weiner is the director of Center for Russian, East European and Eurasian Studies, and his research includes the KGB and the Soviet Union's surveillance state. Weiner is a former research scholar for the Wilson Center, and he was affiliated with the Kennan Institute in 1994–1995.

Biography
Weiner is the Director of Graduate Studies, and holds a B.A. degree from the Hebrew University of Jerusalem in Russian studies, and international relations (1987). He graduated in history (M.A. and Ph.D.) from Columbia University in 1990 and 1995, respectively. Weiner's works include Making Sense of War: The Second World War and the Fate of the Bolshevik Revolution (2002), published by Princeton University Press, and Landscaping the Human Garden: Twentieth-Century Population Management in a Comparative Framework (2003), published by Stanford University Press. He has also contributed to articles, chapters, and reviews in academic publishing and peer-reviewed academic journals, among them critical reviews of The Black Book of Communism (1997) and Bloodlands (2010).

Bibliography

References 

1961 births
20th-century American historians
21st-century American historians
American historians of espionage
American military historians
Historians of Russia
Living people
Stanford University Department of History faculty